David Ross Corrente (born October 13, 1983 in Wallaceburg, Ontario, Canada) is a former Minor League Baseball catcher. Corrente played in the minor leagues from 2001 to 2008 and played for Team Canada in the 2008 Summer Olympics.

Corrente was drafted by the Toronto Blue Jays in the 14th round of the 2001 Major League Baseball Draft. He played in the Blue Jays minor league system from 2001 to 2008 as a catcher. Corrente was a .238 career minor league hitter, and had 252 hits in 1228 at bats.

External links

1983 births
Auburn Doubledays players
Baseball people from Ontario
Baseball players at the 2008 Summer Olympics
Canadian expatriate baseball players in the United States
Charleston AlleyCats players
Dunedin Blue Jays players
Lansing Lugnuts players
Living people
Medicine Hat Blue Jays players
New Hampshire Fisher Cats players
Olympic baseball players of Canada
Syracuse Chiefs players